Yue Yunpeng (born 15 April 1985) is a Chinese actor and xiangsheng performer, best known in film for portraying Zhu Tianpeng in Buddies in India (2017), Yue Yunpeng in Top Funny Comedian: The Movie and Li Shuaiting in Revenge for Love.

Early life
Yue was born in Puyang, Henan on April 15, 1985. At the age of 14, he worked as a guard in a factory located in Shijingshan District of Beijing. He was also worked as waiter in restaurant during his early years.

Career
Yue began his career as a xiangsheng proformer in 2004, after becoming a disciple of Guo Degang.

Yue's first screen acting credit was The Magistrate Ye Guangming (2010). And his first major film role was as Cai Baoqiang in Just For Fun (2012).

In 2015, Yue made a guest appearance as himself on Jian Bing Man, a superhero parody film starring Mabel Yuan, Ada Liu and Da Peng.

Yue starred with Deng Chao, Bai Baihe, Yang Yang, Zhang Tian'ai, Du Juan, and Ada Liu in Zhang Yibai's romantic drama film I Belonged to You (2016). That same year, he joined the main cast of Our Happiness as Yue Qiangnan.

In 2017, three films he headlined, Buddies in India, Revenge for Love and Goldbuster. He starred as Zhu Tianpeng, reuniting him with co-star Wang Baoqiang, who played Monkey King, in the action adventure comedy film Buddies in India. The film grossed  in Chinese box office. He was also cast in the film Revenge for Love, playing the love interest of Mabel Yuan's character. And he co-starred with Shen Teng and Zhang Yi in Sandra Ng's directorial debut Goldbuster. For his role as himself in Top Funny Comedian: The Movie, he was nominated for the Best Supporting Actor at the 9th Macau International Movie Festival. In April, he was invited to be the duet partner for the singer Li Jian in the finals of Singer 2017.

In 2018, Yue starred opposite Ge You and Du Chun in the adventure comedy film Mad Ebriety. He co-starred with Lin Chi-ling, who played his love interest in Guo Degang's directorial debut The Faces of My Gene. He landed a guest role on Feng Gong and Cui Junjie's comedy film Happiness Is Coming, which is set to premiere on June 8, 2018.

Personal life
Yue Yunpeng married Zheng Min on April 26, 2011.

Filmography

Film

TV series

Single

Film and TV Awards

References

External links
 
 
 Yue Yunpeng at hkmdb.com
 Yue Yunpeng at chinesemov.com

1985 births
People from Puyang
Living people
Male actors from Henan
Chinese male stage actors
Chinese male film actors
Chinese male television actors
Chinese xiangsheng performers
21st-century Chinese male actors